Joseph Welzenbacher was a German cyclist from Munich. He competed at the 1896 Summer Olympics in Athens. Welzenbacher entered the 100 kilometres and the 12 hours races.  He did not finish either.

References

External links

Cyclists at the 1896 Summer Olympics
19th-century sportsmen
German male cyclists
Olympic cyclists of Germany
Cyclists from Munich
Year of birth missing
Year of death missing
Place of death missing